Yolanda Vázquez (born 5 November 1960 in Cadiz, Spain) is a Spanish film, television and theatre actress best known for appearing in the film The Air Up There. More recently, she had a cameo in the well-received British indie science fiction thriller, Children of Men. Vazquez has appeared in productions of Shakespeare's A Midsummer Night's Dream (for the Royal Shakespeare Company) and Much Ado About Nothing.

Notable television appearances include the part of Maria in The Final Cut,  the third series in the House of Cards trilogy. She was also in an episode of Midsomer Murders Who Killed Cock Robin? (2001), where she played a Spanish riding instructor. In 1993, she appeared as a tango dancer named Lola in an episode of Agatha Christie's Poirot.

Filmography

References

External links

Living people
British actresses
1960 births